Ondas del Lago Televisión was a Venezuelan regional television network based in Maracaibo, Zulia State.  The network was created in 1957 and lasted only a few months before ceasing operations.

History
The company that owned Ondas del Lago Televisión operated a radio station, known as Ondas del Lago, which was founded on October 10, 1936.  On October 1, 1957, Ondas del Lago Televisión, founded by Nicolás Vale Quintero, went on the air.  It was equipped with RCA technology, it counted on the first transmitters and other artifacts that could receive and emit color images in the country.  Ondas del Lago Televisión disappeared a short time later due to economic problems.

See also
List of Venezuelan over-the-air television networks and stations

References

External links
Detailed history of television in Venezuela 

1957 establishments in Venezuela
1957 disestablishments in Venezuela
Defunct television channels and networks in Venezuela
Television channels and stations established in 1957
Mass media in Maracaibo